Bieup (character: ㅂ) is a consonant of the Korean alphabet. The Unicode for ㅂ is U+3142.  It indicates a 'b' or 'p' sound, depending on its position. At the beginning and end of a word or syllable it indicates a [p] sound, while after a vowel it designates a [b] sound. For example: it is pronounced [p] in 바지 baji ("trousers"), but [b] in 아버지 abeoji ("father").

Stroke order

Other communicative representations

References 

Hangul jamo